Graham Leslie Lionel Clark (born 16 December 1959) is an English jazz violinist based in Buxton, Derbyshire.

He also plays electric guitar. A freelance violinist in most styles of jazz, rock, blues and pop, he specialises in improvisation.

He worked with Daevid Allen from 1988 to 2014:
August 1988 – October 1989: with the Invisible Opera Company of Tibet
October 1989 – December 1991: with Gongmaison
February 1992 – December 1992: with Magick Brothers / Gong
December 1996 – 2014: with Magick Brothers

He has also worked with Andy Sheppard, Keith Tippett, Tim Richards, Phil Lee, Paz, Brian Godding, Elbow, Lamb, Bryan Glancy, Little Sparrow, Jah Wobble, Graham Massey, Louis Gordon and Liz Fletcher.

Notable performances
 "Flocking", 2007, a collaboration between Clark's improvising string quartet and four singers.
 World premiere of two suites by Jean-Claude Vannier, October, 2006 at the Barbican, London: featured soloist with BBC Concert Orchestra.
 BBC Radio 3 broadcast for "Mixing It", 2004: improvised violin duets with Mark Feldman.

Selected discography

Featured artist on:
2009 Improvisations: Series 1 Graham Clark & Stephen Grew (GAS)
2005 Toolshed Album Toolshed (Twisted Nerve)
1997 Isthmus Clark, Thorne, Fell (GAS)
1997 Typhoid and Swans Sleepy People (Edgy Records)
1995 Dreaming a Dream Daevid Allen (GAS)
1992 Shapeshifter Gong (Celluloid, France)
1989 Gongmaison Gongmaison (Demi Monde)

References

External links
 Artist's website

1959 births
Living people
British jazz violinists
British male jazz musicians
English violinists
British male violinists
Place of birth missing (living people)
People educated at Manchester Grammar School
Free improvising musicians
Free jazz violinists
Avant-garde jazz violinists
Gong (band) members
21st-century violinists
21st-century British male musicians